Sir Patrick Playfair Laidlaw   (26 September 1881 – 20 March 1940) was a Scottish virologist.

Biography
Laidlaw was born in Glasgow, the son of Robert Laidlaw, M.D., at that time Superintendent of the Glasgow Medical Mission. He was educated at Leys School, Cambridge and St. John’s College, Cambridge.

From 1920–23, he studied the properties of histamine at the Wellcome Physiological Research Laboratories after which he went to Guy's Hospital as a lecturer in experimental pathology. As a virologist at the Medical Research Council in 1922 his researches on dog-distemper led to two ways of immunisation against it, which achievement earned him the award of a Royal Medal by the Royal Society in 1933. In 1927 he had been elected  a fellow of the Royal Society.

He was one of the scientists working at the Medical Research Council (NIMR Farm Laboratories) at Mill Hill who first isolated influenza virus from humans. This happened when ferrets they were working on to develop a distemper vaccine caught influenza from one of the scientists in the laboratory.

He was knighted in the 1935 Birthday Honours for distinguished service to medical science.

He died unmarried at the age of 58.

Notes

Further reading
Smith W, Andrewes CH, Laidlaw PP. A virus obtained from influenza patients. Lancet. 1933;2:66–8. 
Distemper and Influenza at Mill Hill by Rick Carver and John Skehel from Mill Hill Essays 2000

External links
 

1881 births
1940 deaths
Scientists from Glasgow
Alumni of St John's College, Cambridge
British virologists
Influenza researchers
Fellows of the Royal Society
Fellows of the Royal College of Physicians
Royal Medal winners
Knights Bachelor